Buchanan Historic District is a national historic district located at Buchanan, Botetourt County, Virginia. It encompasses 277 contributing buildings, 5 contributing sites, and 4 contributing structures in Buchanan and Pattonsburg on both sides of the James River.  They include commercial, transportation-related, domestic, religious, and industrial resources associated with the community's development from the late-18th century through the late-20th century.  Notable buildings include the Pattonsburg Mill (1838), Buchanan Presbyterian Church (1845), Trinity Episcopal Church (1842), Hotel Botetourt (1851), Sorrell House (1850), James Evans Mason Lodge (1884), Virginia Can Company complex (1903), "Oak Hill" (1840), Town Hall Municipal Building, Bank of Buchanan, Ransone's Drugstore, Buchanan Theatre (1919), and Buchanan High School (1928).  The contributing sites include the James River & Kanawha Canal project site, Johnston-Boyd Cemetery (1835–1906), and Mountain View Cemetery (1854). The contributing structures include the Stone Arch Tunnel (1870s).  Also located in the district is the separately listed Wilson Warehouse.

It was listed on the National Register of Historic Places in 1999.

References

External links
Wilson Warehouse, Lowe & Washington Streets, Buchanan, Botetourt County, VA: 1 photo and 1 photo caption page at Historic American Buildings Survey
Ebenezer Methodist Church, Main Street, Buchanan, Botetourt County, VA: 1 photo and 1 photo caption page at Historic American Buildings Survey
James River Suspension Bridge, Spanning James River, Route 11, Buchanan, Botetourt County, VA: 9 photos and 1 photo caption page at Historic American Engineering Record

Historic districts on the National Register of Historic Places in Virginia
Geography of Botetourt County, Virginia
National Register of Historic Places in Botetourt County, Virginia